Charaut Math is a temple at Charaut block (Sitamarhi), in the Indian state of Bihar, of the Lakshminarayan monastic order group of the Hindu tradition.

History 
Charaut Math is a Hindu monastery. It was founded by Mahant Jai Kishun. He was earlier a Mahanth (Head of Hindu Monastery) in a Hindu Math at Matihani Math (Yjnayavalkya Lakshminarayan Vidyapeeth) of Nepal territory. He founded this Hindu Math when the Maharaja of Darbhanga Raj granted this village for the purpose of building Hindu Monastery to impart Vedic education to students. It was founded in 1761. It became an important center for the Hindu Vedic culture and tradition and education.
Charaut was a part of the kingdom of Darbhanga Raj, in the 18th century.

The history of the math has also been described in the book "Antiquarian Remains In Bihar" , written by D R Patil, Superintendent, Archeological Survey of India, South-Western Circle, Aurangabad, Maharashtra in 1963.

Within the Math 

There is Lakshminarayan Mandir in the campus of the math. There is also a Sanskrit school in the Math which was established in 1926 known as Sri Laksmi Narayan Sanskrit High School, Choraut.

References 

Shiva temples in Bihar
Hindu monasteries in India
Tourist attractions in Bihar
Ashramas
Sanskrit areas of India